Canal 32 is a private French generalist television channel from Troyes and the department of Aube visible locally on DTT and everywhere in France for the box owners. It was launched on November 23, 2001 at the initiative of a former journalist, Claude Patin, to publish various cultural, sports and miscellaneous information of the Trojan agglomeration (Claude Patin with Jacques Ségui create this local and departmental channel).

Programs 
The program schedule of Canal 32 is composed of magazines and information about the city of Troyes and the department of Aube as well as local events.

It broadcasts a live magazine segment from Monday to Friday between 7:00 pm and 8:00 pm, interspersed with the news at 6:30 pm. The latter is also multi-broadcast at 7:30 pm and 8:30 pm and 9:30 pm. The programs are broadcast several times a week and especially on weekends. The channel proposes a loop of programs with a variable duration between 3 and 4 hours. Nevertheless, this loop can be broken during particular events taking place in the Trojan agglomeration.

Canal 32 participated in the two syndications for the series. It aired season 1 of 24 and the series MASH and The Practice. Every other Wednesday, it also broadcasts Game'In TV, a program about video games.

Broadcasting 
Canal 32 is broadcast in Troyes and its agglomeration as well as in the south of the Aube department. Since April 2, 2011, Canal 32 has ceased its analog broadcasting, its hertzian broadcasting area did not cover the entire department of Aube because of the presence of other transmitters located in the west of the department.

Visual Identity (Logo)

References

External links 
Official website

Television stations in France
Television channels and stations established in 2001
French-language television stations